Agromyces humatus is a Gram-positive, aerobic and non-motile bacterium from the genus of Agromyces which has been isolated from a wall of a tomb from the Catacombs of Domitilla in Italy.

References 

Microbacteriaceae
Bacteria described in 2005